Scooby-Doo! Curse of the Lake Monster is a 2010 American made-for-television comedy horror mystery film directed by Brian Levant for Cartoon Network and based on the Saturday morning cartoon series Scooby-Doo by Hanna-Barbera. It is a sequel to the 2009 film Scooby-Doo! The Mystery Begins. Robbie Amell, Hayley Kiyoko, Kate Melton, Nick Palatas and Frank Welker cast reprise their roles. The film was shot in Santa Clarita, California and Sherwood Country Club in Thousand Oaks, California and premiered on October 16, 2010.

Plot
Summer vacation has come and Velma, Shaggy and Scooby-Doo meet up with Fred and Daphne so they can go to meet Daphne's uncle, Thornton "Thorny" Blake V, who has given them summer jobs at his country club in Erie Point in order to pay back damages from a prior mystery. The night of the club's opening party, a huge frog-like monster suddenly appears and wreaks havoc. The gang decides to investigate the only person who has ever taken a picture of the lake monster, a lighthouse keeper named Elmer Uggins. He then tells them the story of the lake monster: when people were first settling in Erie Point, a witch named Wanda Grubwort warned them not to come onto her land. They paid no attention to her, so she used her magic staff - which used moonstones as the source of her power - to turn a frog into a horrible monster that attacked the villagers. Wanda was later tried for her crimes and burnt at the stake.

The next day, Velma shows the others security footage of the lake monster meeting a mysteriously cloaked figure on the beach. They begin to zoom in on the figure to see its face, but Velma accidentally spills her green tea on the computer and destroys the footage. Things are further complicated due to friction between Fred and Daphne, whose relationship is strained due to them regularly finding each other socializing with other people, as well as Shaggy's blossoming feelings for Velma causing him to alienate Scooby.

The next morning, they find Velma unconscious on the beach. Shaggy begins to tell her that he was very worried, but stops when he notices warts on her hand. Velma looks surprised, but guiltily assures them that it is nothing. After they fill her in on the latest monster attack, Daphne says that she saw purple paint on the figure's cloak and suggests they check out a boat that they saw on the way to Erie Point. Shaggy asks Velma out on a date, and things go well until he lights a match to light some candles. Velma flings herself back in terror, though she is unsure why. Scooby, who is angry at Shaggy for ignoring him, tries to ruin the date, causing Shaggy to knock over the table and drop the moonstone on the ground that he was going to give to Velma as a surprise. Fred and Daphne go to see the boat, but are then locked in a flooding room by the monster. However, they are able to escape.

The gang drives to the home of Hilda Trowburg, who is Wanda's descendant. They see the witch's figure through the windows, who is soon discovered to be a very warty Velma. She claims to not be Velma and attacks the gang, knocking them out for a moment. The gang wakes up later and find Trowburg, who says that the spirit of her ancestor has possessed Velma. The gang realizes that their infighting caused them to miss all the little signs - the warts, Velma's fear of fire, her love of moonstones and how she spilled the tea on the video of the witch because it was going to show her face - that should have proved Velma was up to something. Trowburg says that Wanda probably would have gone to the underwater caves; they arrive in the cave and Shaggy bursts out of hiding and confronts Wanda, who turns a trio of frogs into new monsters and sends them after the gang.
 
As the monsters corner Fred and Daphne, Shaggy tries to save Velma by singing her favorite song. Velma joins in and manages to break free of Wanda's possession. Wanda tries to reclaim her staff, but Scooby arrives just in time and smashes it, destroying Wanda and turning the monsters back into their original forms. Shaggy confesses how much he really likes Velma and they share a kiss, but both realize that they did not feel a single spark and, along with Fred and Daphne, agree that it is better if they are just friends. Thornton thanks the gang for saving his county club and promises to hook them up with a lawyer so they can avoid any future legal problems, prompting Daphne to name their group Mystery Inc.

Cast
 Robbie Amell as Fred Jones
 Hayley Kiyoko as Velma Dinkley
 Kate Melton as Daphne Blake
 Nick Palatas as Shaggy Rogers
 Frank Welker as the voice of Scooby-Doo 
 Ted McGinley as Thornton "Thorny" Blake V
 Richard Moll as Elmer Uggins
 Nichelle Nichols as the senator
 Marion Ross as Hilda Trowburg
 Beverly Sanders as Wanda Grubwort

Trailer
A short trailer of the film was shown on Cartoon Network on August 1, 2010, depicting Scooby and Shaggy at the beach.

Ratings
The television premiere drew 5.1 million viewers.

Home media
The film was released on DVD by Warner Home Video on March 1, 2011. Warner Bros. Home Entertainment distributed the film on Blu-ray Disc.

References

External links
 
 
 

2010 television films
2010 films
2010s adventure films
2010s ghost films
2010s monster movies
American comedy television films
American adventure comedy films
American ghost films
American mystery films
Cartoon Network original programming
2010s English-language films
Scooby-Doo live-action films
Films about dogs
Films about vacationing
Films directed by Brian Levant
Films partially in color
Films set in Ohio
Films shot in California
Television sequel films
Television prequel films
Interquel films
Warner Bros. direct-to-video films
Atlas Entertainment films
Films scored by David Newman
2010 comedy films
2010s American films
American prequel films